MIT OpenCourseWare (MIT OCW) is an initiative of the Massachusetts Institute of Technology (MIT) to publish all of the educational materials from its undergraduate- and graduate-level courses online, freely and openly available to anyone, anywhere. The project was announced on April 4, 2001, and uses Creative Commons Attribution-NonCommercial-ShareAlike license. The program was originally funded by the William and Flora Hewlett Foundation, the Andrew W. Mellon Foundation, and MIT. MIT OpenCourseWare is supported by MIT, corporate underwriting, major gifts, and donations from site visitors. The initiative inspired a number of other institutions to make their course materials available as open educational resources.

, over 2,400 courses were available online. While a few of these were limited to chronological reading lists and discussion topics, a majority provided homework problems and exams (often with solutions) and lecture notes. Some courses also included interactive web demonstrations in Java, complete textbooks written by MIT professors, and streaming video lectures.

, 100 courses included complete video lectures. The videos were available in streaming mode, but could also be downloaded for viewing offline. All video and audio files were also available from YouTube, iTunes U and the Internet Archive.

Project
MIT OpenCourseWare sits within MIT Open Learning at the Massachusetts Institute of Technology.

History
The concept of MIT OpenCourseWare grew out of the MIT Council on Education Technology, which was charged by MIT provost Robert Brown in 1999 with determining how MIT should position itself in the distance learning/e-learning environment.  MIT OpenCourseWare was then initiated to provide a new model for the dissemination of knowledge and collaboration among scholars around the world, and contributes to the “shared intellectual commons” in academia, which fosters collaboration across MIT and among other scholars. The project was spearheaded by professors Dick K.P Yue, Shigeru Miyagawa, Hal Abelson and other MIT Faculty.

The main challenge in implementing the MIT OCW initiative had not been faculty resistance, but rather, the logistical challenges presented by determining ownership and obtaining publication permission for the massive amount of copyrighted items that are embedded in the course materials of MIT's faculty, in addition to the time and technical effort required to  convert the educational materials to an online format. Copyright in MIT OpenCourseWare material remains with MIT, members of its faculty, or its students.

In September 2002, the MIT OpenCourseWare proof-of-concept pilot site opened to the public, offering 32 courses. In September 2003, MIT OpenCourseWare published its 500th course, including some courses with complete streaming video lectures. By September 2004, 900 MIT courses were available online.

In 2005, MIT OpenCourseWare and other open educational resources projects formed the OpenCourseWare Consortium, which seeks to extend the reach and impact of open course materials, foster new open course materials and develop sustainable models for open course material publication.

In 2007, MIT OpenCourseWare introduced a site called Highlights for High School that indexes resources on the MIT OCW applicable to advanced high school study in biology, chemistry, calculus and physics in an effort to support US STEM education at the secondary school level.

In 2011, MIT OpenCourseWare introduced the first of fifteen OCW Scholar courses, which are designed specifically for the needs of independent learners.  While still publications of course materials like the rest of the site content, these courses are more in-depth and the materials are presented in logical sequences that facilitate self-study.  No interaction with other students is supported by the OCW site, but study groups on collaborating project OpenStudy are available for some OCW Scholar courses.

In 2012 Harvard and MIT launched edX, a massive open online course (MOOC) provider to deliver online learning opportunities to the public.

Between 2013 and 2019, some MIT OCW courses were delivered by the European MooC platform Eliademy.

Technology
MIT OCW was originally served by a custom content management system based on Microsoft's Content Management Server, which was replaced in mid-2010 with a Plone-based content management system. The publishing process is described by MIT as a "large-scale digital publishing infrastructure consists of planning tools, a content management system (CMS), and the MIT OpenCourseWare content distribution infrastructure".

Video content for the courses was originally primarily in RealMedia format.  In 2008, OCW transitioned to using YouTube as the primary digital video streaming platform for the site, embedding YouTube video back into the OCW site. OCW video and audio files are also provided in full for offline downloads on iTunesU and the Internet Archive.  In 2011, OCW introduced an iPhone App called LectureHall in partnership with Irynsoft.

Funding
, the annual cost of running MIT OCW was about $3.5 million. In 2011, "MIT's goal for the next decade [was] to increase our reach ten-fold" and to secure funding for this.

See also

Bookboon
Connexions, by Rice University
Curriki
Fathom.com
Flat World Knowledge
Flexbook
Free High School Science Texts South Africa
National Programme on Technology Enhanced Learning (NPTEL), India
Open.Michigan
Open textbook
Tufts OpenCourseWare

References

External links
 

Creative Commons-licensed works
American educational websites
Massachusetts Institute of Technology
OpenCourseWare
Internet properties established in 2002
Articles containing video clips
Digital humanities projects
Open educational resources
Science-related YouTube channels